The 7th Annual Gotham Independent Film Awards, presented by the Independent Filmmaker Project, were held on September 16, 1997 and were hosted by Jon Stewart. At the ceremony, Bob and Harvey Weinstein were honored with a Career Tribute with Kevin Kline, Ruth Prawer Jhabvala, Faith Hubley and Errol Morris receiving the other individual awards.

Winners and nominees

Breakthrough Director (Open Palm Award)
 Macky Alston – Family Name
 Morgan J. Freeman – Hurricane Streets
 John O’Hagan – Wonderland
 Ira Sachs – The Delta
 Alex Sichel – All Over Me

Actor Award
 Kevin Kline

Filmmaker Award
 Faith Hubley
 Errol Morris

Writer Award
 Ruth Prawer Jhabvala

Career Tribute
 Bob and Harvey Weinstein

References

External links
 

1997
1997 film awards